The Adelong Creek, a perennial river that is part of the Murrumbidgee catchment within the Murray–Darling basin, is located in the South West Slopes, and Riverina regions of New South Wales, Australia.

Course and features 
The Adelong Creek (technically a river) rises below , southwest of  sourced by runoff from the Australian Alps, part of the Great Dividing Range. The creek descends  over its  course.

The river is crossed by the Snowy Mountains Highway at Adelong; and the Hume Highway at Tumblong.

See also 

 List of rivers of New South Wales (A-K)
 Rivers of New South Wales

References

External links
Murrumbidgee Catchment Management Authority website
 

Rivers of New South Wales
Tributaries of the Murrumbidgee River
Rivers in the Riverina